Arthur Docker (3 June 1848 – 8 April 1929) was an Australian cricketer. He played one first-class match for New South Wales in 1871/72. He was the fourth son of English-Australian pastoralist and politician Joseph Docker. His son, George, was also a first-class cricketer.

See also
 List of New South Wales representative cricketers

References

External links
 

1848 births
1929 deaths
Australian cricketers
New South Wales cricketers